Very is a crater on Mars, located south of the planet's equator in the heavily cratered highlands of Terra Sirenum in the Phaethontis quadrangle at 49.2°S and 177.1°W. It measures approximately  in diameter. The crater was named after American astronomer Frank Washington Very.

Description
On the basis of their form, aspects, positions, and location amongst and apparent interaction with features thought to be rich in water ice, many researchers believed that the processes carving the gullies involve liquid water. However, this remains a topic of active research.  
As soon as gullies were discovered, researchers began to image many gullies over and over, looking for possible changes. By 2006, some changes were found. Later, with further analysis it was determined that the changes could have occurred by dry granular flows rather than being driven by flowing water. With continued observations many more changes were found in Gasa Crater and others.  
With more repeated observations, more and more changes have been found; since the changes occur in the winter and spring, experts are tending to believe that gullies were formed from dry ice. Before-and-after images demonstrated the timing of this activity coincided with seasonal carbon-dioxide frost and temperatures that would not have allowed for liquid water. When dry ice frost changes to a gas, it may lubricate dry material to flow especially on steep slopes.

See also 
 List of craters on Mars

References

External links 
 
 Newton Crater
 Solar Views

Impact craters on Mars
Phaethontis quadrangle